32 members of the LGBT community are known to have held office in the United States Congress. In the House, 29 LGBT people held office; in the Senate, 3 held office. Two people, Tammy Baldwin and Kyrsten Sinema, served in the House and were later elected into the Senate. The earliest known LGBT congressperson was Ed Koch, who began his term in the House in 1969. The earliest known LGBT senator is Harris Wofford, who began his term in 1991. Both men were not out during their tenure: Koch's sexuality was confirmed after his death and Wofford announced his plans to marry a man over 20 years after serving in the Senate. There are no known transgender congresspeople.

 13 openly LGBT members of the current (118th) Congress, most of whom are Democrats. Two are senators and the rest are House representatives. This constitutes the most LGBT congresspeople serving at the same time in U.S. history.

Senate

House of Representatives

Shadow representatives

See also
 Congressional LGBTQ+ Equality Caucus
 List of LGBT politicians in the United States
 List of the first LGBT holders of political offices in the United States

Notes

References

 
United States
LGBT
Lists of American LGBT people